The Toowoomba Region is a local government area located in the Darling Downs part of Queensland, Australia. Established in 2008, it was preceded by several previous local government areas with histories extending back to the early 1900s and beyond.

In 2018–2019, it had a A$491 million budget, of which A$316 million is for service delivery and A$175.13 million capital (infrastructure) budget.

History
Prior to the 2008 amalgamation, the Toowoomba Region existed as eight distinct local government areas: the City of Toowoomba and the Shires of Cambooya, Clifton, Crows Nest, Jondaryan, Millmerran, Pittsworth, and Rosalie.

The City had its beginning in the Toowoomba Municipality which was proclaimed on 24 November 1860 under the Municipalities Act 1858, a piece of New South Wales legislation inherited by Queensland when it became a separate colony in 1859. William Henry Groom, sometimes described as the "father of Toowoomba", was elected its first mayor. It achieved a measure of autonomy in 1878 with the enactment of the Local Government Act. With the passage of the Local Authorities Act 1902, Toowoomba became a town council on 31 March 1903. On 29 October 1904, Toowoomba was proclaimed a City.

The Toowoomba Region also encompassed four of Queensland's 74 divisions created under the Divisional Boards Act 1879 on 11 November 1879: Clifton, Highfields, Jondaryan and Rosalie. On 31 March 1903, these became Shires. Between 1913 and 1917, a number of changes occurred: the Millmerran and Pittsworth areas voted to split from Jondaryan on 24 April 1913, whilst in the same year Crows Nest became a shire, and in 1914, Cambooya followed. On 19 March 1949, Highfields and Drayton were abolished, with their land going to Crows Nest and Toowoomba respectively.

In July 2007, the Local Government Reform Commission released its report and recommended that the eight areas amalgamate. Its main reason for recommending such a large area was that the region was a growth area and a new organisation would have political advocacy capabilities on behalf of the region. Two other key factors were that Toowoomba's suburbs had expanded well beyond the City of Toowoomba and a new entity would be able to manage the entire area under one plan. Additionally, environmental and natural resource challenges could, in the Commission's view, be better met by an organisation with "a scale and capacity to undertake... management across the region in an integrated manner." Four of the councils, Jondaryan, Millmerran, Pittsworth and Rosalie were rated as financially weak by the Queensland Treasury. While no council had supported the Commission's model, most were willing to consider some form of amalgamation, and the Commission considered whether Millmerran should be united with Dalby or Toowoomba carefully. In the end, its proposal was unchanged. On 15 March 2008, the City and Shires formally ceased to exist, and elections were held on the same day to elect councillors and a mayor to the Regional Council.

Council
The council remains undivided and its elected body consists of 10 councillors and a mayor. Toowoomba Regional Councillors are not officially endorsed by political parties. They are required to declare memberships of political parties, bodies, associations and trade or professional organisations.

Mayors 

 2008: Peter Taylor 
 2012: Paul Antonio 
 2016: Paul Antonio 
 2020: Paul Antonio

Towns and localities
The Toowoomba Region includes the following settlements:

Toowoomba suburbs 

 Blue Mountain Heights1
 Centenary Heights
 Cotswold Hills2
 Cranley
 Darling Heights
 Drayton
 East Toowoomba
 Glenvale2
 Harlaxton

 Harristown
 Highfields1
 Kearneys Spring
 Middle Ridge
 Mount Kynoch
 Mount Lofty
 Newtown
 North Toowoomba
 Prince Henry Heights

 Rangeville
 Redwood
 Rockville
 South Toowoomba
 Toowoomba City
 Torrington2
 Wilsonton
 Wilsonton Heights

Close Regional Localities 

 Birnam1
 Charlton2
 Finnie3
 Gowrie Junction2

 Hodgson Vale3
 Mount Rascal3
 Preston4
 Spring Bluff1

 Top Camp3
 Vale View3
 Wellcamp2

1 - split with the former Shire of Crows Nest
2 - split with the former Shire of Jondaryan
3 - split with the former Shire of Cambooya>
4 - split with Lockyer Region>

Regional localities 

Cambooya area:

 Cambooya
 East Greenmount
 Greenmount
 Westbrook
Clifton area:
 Back Plains
 Clifton
 Ellangowan
 Kings Creek
 Nobby
 Pilton
 Ryeford
 Spring Creek

Crows Nest area:
 Crows Nest
 Cabarlah
 Cawdor
 Djuan
 Emu Creek
 Geham
 Glenaven
 Haden
 Hampton
 Meringandan
 Pechey
 Pierces Creek
 Ravensbourne

Jondaryan area:
 Oakey
 Athol
 Aubigny
 Evanslea
 Gowrie Mountain
 Grassdale
 Jondaryan
Millmerran area:
 Millmerran
 Bringalily
 Cecil Plains
 Domville
 Lavelle
 Lemontree
 Millmerran Downs
 Pampas
 Tummaville
 Turallin
 Yandilla

Pittsworth area:
 Pittsworth
 Biddeston
 Bongeen
 Branchview
 Brookstead
 Broxburn
 Felton
 Irongate
 Kincora
 Linthorpe
 Mount Tyson
 Nangwee
 North Branch
 Norwin
 Rossvale
 Scrubby Mountain
 Southbrook
 Springside
 St Helens
 Stoneleigh
 Yarranlea

Rosalie area:
 Goombungee
 Acland
 Evergreen
 Glencoe
 Meringandan West
 Upper Yarraman
 Yarraman
Mixed-area localities:
 Bowenville
 Gowrie Mountain
 Kingsthorpe
 Nobby
 Wyreema

Economy
Economic growth potential in the region has been identified through retail, construction and the development of energy resources found in the Surat Basin and in food processing. As well as the development of the newly built Wellcamp Airport and Second Range Crossing, and proposed Inland Rail the city is set to become one of the largest logistical centres in the country as well as a major inland port.

Population

The total population recorded at each census before the foundation of the Toowoomba Region combines the population of its component entities prior to their amalgamation in 2008. Its population was officially recorded for the first time in the 2011 Census.

Toowoomba Regional Library Services 
The Toowoomba Regional Council operates the following libraries:
 Toowoomba City Library
 Toowoomba Local History Library
 Cecil Plains library
 Clifton Library
 Crows Nest Library (also known as the John French Library)
 Goombungee Library
 Highfields Library
 Millmerran Library
 Oakey Library
 Pittsworth Library
 Quinalow Library
 Yarraman Library 
 and a mobile library which visits the communities of Bowenville, Cambooya, Cooyar, Gowrie Junction, Greenmount, Haden, Jondaryan, Kingsthorpe, Kulpi, Meringandan West, Mount Tyson, Westbrook, and Wyreema.

The Toowoomba Regional Libraries also provide a range of services including (but not limited to) free computer and internet access, free computer classes, and a Homebound Library Service for those who are temporarily or permanently home bound.

References

External links

 Toowoomba.org - Toowoomba's Homepage

 
Toowoomba
Darling Downs
2008 establishments in Australia